Joseph James Oastler (born 3 July 1990) is an English professional footballer who plays for Havant & Waterlooville as a defender.

Playing career
Oastler was born in Portsmouth, Hampshire. He worked his way through the youth team of his local club Portsmouth, where he played from the age of eight; however, he was deemed surplus to requirements and was then released in March 2008. To retain fitness he joined Conference South club Bognor Regis Town, where he played three games, before joining the ranks of Queens Park Rangers in summer 2008.

He spent the first half of the 2009–10 season on loan at administration-stricken Salisbury City of the Conference National, along with teammate Lee Brown. He made eleven appearances for the club, including eight starts, before returning to Loftus Road before the end of the calendar year. At one point the club had feared that Oastler had fallen victim to the swine flu pandemic. On 20 April 2010 he made his debut in the Football League, replacing Ákos Buzsáky as a substitute in a 1–0 home win over Watford. At the end of the season Neil Warnock offered him a new one-year deal, which he duly signed.
In October 2010 Oastler joined Torquay United signing on a month's loan and making his debut on 9 October in a 3–3 away draw against Crewe. He went on to make 19 starts and 12 sub appearances for Torquay, including a late cameo appearance in the Football League Two play-off final at Old Trafford.

In June 2011, Queens Park Rangers announced his release. Later that month, Oastler signed a permanent two-year deal with Torquay United. Oastler scored a lob from the half-way line against Tiverton Town in a pre-season friendly for the Gulls and also scored in the 6–2 friendly win over Truro City. Oastler made his league debut as a full Torquay player in the 2–2 draw against Burton Albion on 6 August 2011. He was included in the League Two Team of the Week for 13/14 August 2011, after a particularly impressive performance in the win over Bristol Rovers. He was released by Torquay at the end of the 2012–2013 season.
Oastler joined Aldershot Town for the 2013–2014 season and scored on his league debut against Grimsby Town. His impressive form at the start of the season earned him a call up to the England C team to face Latvia.

Oastler completed a move to Oxford City ahead of the 2017–18 season, missing just 20 minutes of football throughout his first campaign at the club. Oastler ended the season by lifting the Oxfordshire Senior Cup as captain, and was made the permanent club captain ahead of 2018–19 season.

After 4 seasons with Oxford City, Oastler moved to Havant & Waterlooville in May 2021.

Statistics

References

External links
Profile at the Official Queens Park Rangers site

1990 births
Living people
Footballers from Portsmouth
English footballers
Association football defenders
Portsmouth F.C. players
Bognor Regis Town F.C. players
Queens Park Rangers F.C. players
Torquay United F.C. players
Salisbury City F.C. players
Aldershot Town F.C. players
Oxford City F.C. players
Havant & Waterlooville F.C. players
English Football League players
National League (English football) players